The Wilderness 101 Mountain Bicycle Race is an ultra-endurance  mountain bike race held annually in late July. The race is commonly called the W101, akin to a first year college course, such as Physics 101, at the nearby Penn State University.

The race was first held in 1991 and been held continuously since 2001. The W101 starts and ends in a small village Coburn, Pennsylvania near Millheim, Pennsylvania. The W101 course is a single loop covering roads, forest roads and trails. The majority of the course is within the Bald Eagle and Rothrock Pennsylvania State Forests. The event is organized and run primarily by Shenandoah Mountain Touring (located in Harrisonburg, VA) and has been one of the stops of the National Ultra Endurance Series since 2006.

History

1991 to 1994
The Wilderness 101 was first held in 1991 organized by a bicycle shop location in State College, PA (The Bicycle Shop). The owner of the Bicycle Shop, Randy Moore, put together an off-road loop of 101 miles, with the specific goal to be longer than a 100-mile race. They also wanted to do the loop as a point-to-point ride because the early off-road century races were lap races, most held at ski areas. Moore was among the early east coast mountain bike pioneers who discovered the trail riding in Rothrock and Bald Eagle State Forests in the late 1980s. In addition to the 101, they held a 30-mile mountain bike race that started and finished in Coburn, PA annually.

The inaugural winner of the 1991 race was Harry Winard with a time of 6:59. He was a Penn State student at the time and according to an interview in the Oct 1991 Dirt Rag, only decided to race the event the week before. Harry won the race on a Bridgestone MB-0 mountain bike with very narrow and smooth tires (1.5"  
Avocet Cross) and a set triathlon aero bars. The modern courses with more trails and rougher trails would reduce the chance of someone winning on such a bicycle. These changes also prohibit comparing the finishing times from the earlier events to the current events.

It is not known if any women started or finished the 1991 events. The 1992 Woman's winner was Susan Combine  John Stamstad, a famous pioneer in endurance and ultra-endurance mountain bike events, won the 1993 race. In these early editions of the race, each finisher was given a shirt after finishing that listed their placing and finish time in felt iron-on letters and numbers.

2001 to Present
In 2001 a company unrelated to the original organization, Shenandoah Mountain Touring from Harrisonburg, VA re-established the race. This organization has now held the race annually since and plans to for the foreseeable future.

Jay Duff won the first of the re-established event in 2001. His finishing time of 7:07 cannot be compared to the times of the 2002 and later events as a significantly larger amount of new challenging single-track sections were added.

The current course records are as follows:
Open men: Jeff Schalk, 6:26, 2011
Open women: Vicki Barclay, 7:14, 2015
Master's men:
Master's women:
Single Speed Men:
Single Speed Women:

Course
The 1991–1993 race courses were primarily fire-roads and roads. A guide book by Scott Adams, Mountain Bike Madness in Central PA  has a write up and map on the course. The early years even included a short section along the margin of a busy highway (rt 322). This section has been rerouted to use a service tunnel under the highway, and the highway itself has been elevated on the return loop so racers use a quieter underpass. The 2001 and later race courses contain substantially more trails and degraded fire-roads. In subsequent years the organizer has added more trails (single-track and double-track) as new trails are opened or their condition improved. Even when new trails are not included, the course often has to be changed to avoid areas closed by forestry operations, changing trail conditions or due to requests of the managing agencies.

Results

See also
 Rothrock State Forest
 Bald Eagle State Forest
 Shenandoah 100

References

External links
 US National Ultra Series
 The event's primary website by Shenandoah Mountain Touring
 Media Coverage of past events
 Coverage of the 2005 event on Cycling News
 Coverage of the 2003 event.

Mountain biking events in the United States
Endurance games
Cycle races in the United States
Recurring sporting events established in 1991
1991 establishments in Pennsylvania